The Alliance for the Union of Romanians (AUR) is a right-wing populist and nationalist political party currently active in Romania and Moldova. It was founded on 19 September 2019. This was done with the intention of participating in the 2020 Romanian local and legislative elections. Currently, the party president is George Simion.

The party ran in the local elections, not obtaining many votes and only winning in three towns. However, in the legislative elections, the AUR won 9% of the votes in all of Romania and its diaspora, thus becoming the fourth-largest party in the country at the central level, which surprised observers.

AUR aims for the unification of all Romanians from Romania and Romanian-populated neighbouring zones, and for the support of the Romanian diaspora in other countries. The party seeks the unification of Moldova and Romania, supports NATO membership and aims for energy independence for Romania. It claims it is a centre-right, Christian democratic party. However, it has been accused of supporting anti-vaccination ideas and being Magyarophobic, neo-fascist, pro-Russian and antisemitic, although relevant figures of the party have rejected all these accusations. The party states that its four main pillars are "family, nation, Christian faith, and liberty".

History
The Alliance for the Union of Romanians was formally established on 19 September 2019. Later, during the Great Union Day of Romania on 1 December 2019, its leader, George Simion, said the party's aims were to participate in the 2020 Romanian local and legislative elections of the country. Simion had up to this point been a campaigner for the unification of Romania and the Republic of Moldova. Claudiu Târziu, who was co-president of the party along Simion until 27 March 2022, was a member of Coalition for the Family which unsuccessfully campaigned to ban gay marriage through constitutional change in a 2018 referendum.

On 26 June 2020, AUR condemned the disinterest of the Romanian authorities regarding the minority rights of the Romanians in Serbia and Ukraine and declared that it would fully support them once it entered the Romanian Parliament. Two days later, AUR also condemned the 80th anniversary of the annexation of Bessarabia, Northern Bukovina, and the Hertsa region by the Soviet Union, declaring that "it is our obligation to regain our state".

By July 2020, AUR counted 22 branches in Europe and North America for the Romanian diaspora. The first of these was established in Wolverhampton, in the United Kingdom.

AUR was the only party in Romania that expressed support for Donald Trump in the 2020 United States presidential election.

2020 Romanian local elections
During the 2020 Romanian local elections, AUR won the mayoralty in three towns: Amara, Pufești, and Valea Lungă.

2020 Romanian legislative election
In the 2020 Romanian legislative election, AUR obtained a high percentage of the votes, being called as the "surprise" of Romania. The results also increased the popularity of the party on the Internet. The party came first among Romanians in Italy, the largest group of the Romanian diaspora, and ran a close second among Romanians in France and Romanians in Spain. It also scored first in Cyprus.

AUR's candidate for prime minister was Călin Georgescu, who worked for the United Nations for 17 years.

According to a statement released by AUR, between 7 and 8 December 2020, 15,000 Romanians joined the party in just 24 hours. The party is supposedly to have 46 members of parliament in the 2020–2024 Romanian legislature, according to the same statement.

The party achieved good results in rural areas of Moldavia and Dobruja, areas traditionally dominated by the other big parties. Its most significant percentages were in the counties where the Romanian Orthodox Church has a strong influence and a large number of practicing believers. These are Suceava (14.72%), Botoșani (14.62%), Neamț (14.4%), Constanța (14.2%), and Vrancea (13.43%).

The party speculated the new communication channels (social networks) in a similar way to the Greater Romania Party (PRM) of the late 1990s - early 2000s, which used the newspaper "România Mare" (Greater Romania) as a communication channel, reaching high electoral scores. Another example is the People's Party – Dan Diaconescu (PP-DD), which was propelled with the help of the OTV television channel.

Recorder, a Romanian online publisher, argues that the election campaign of AUR has adapted to the rural environment, which lacks modern technology, relying more on messages desired by the masses than on a coherent ideology. In this way, they argue, in addition to a core of supporters who voted for radical messages, there is also the wider category of electorate strictly attracted by populist messages.

December 2020–present
On 22 January 2021, Simion announced that the party would officially adhere at European level to the "European Conservatives and Reformists Party" after going on visits in Poland and Brussels, Belgium.

Simion announced on 15 March 2021 that the AUR had intentions to start operating in the Republic of Moldova on the occasion of the Day of the Union of Bessarabia with Romania celebrated every 27 March. The party was officially launched, as previously stated, on 27 March 2021, and the elected president of the party was Vlad Bilețchi, a renowned Moldovan unionist. This new section of the AUR in Moldova later participated in the Moldovan snap parliamentary elections of 11 July 2021.

On 2 October 2021, AUR organised a 15,000–20,000 people-strong protest against COVID-19 restrictions at the Victory Square in Bucharest, drawing both national and international attention and being the most attended protest in Romania since the start of the pandemic.

On 5 October 2021, a motion of no confidence initiated by AUR, but legally proposed by PSD, was passed with 281 votes, thus dismissing the Cîțu Cabinet.

On 27 March 2022, AUR held its first party congress at the Palace of the Parliament. On it, it was intended to elect the party's president. There were two candidates, Simion and Dănuț Aelena, AUR deputy in the Constanța County. Aelena claimed to have nominated himself with the simple intention of showing that AUR was a democratic party and that he did not intend to "expel" Simion from the party, admitting that he was less well-known compared to him. 784 voted for Simion and 38 for Aelena, making Simion the party's sole president after having previously shared leadership with Târziu, who became president of the party's CNC.

Ideology

According to the party's website, AUR's ultimate goal is to achieve the unification of all Romanians "wherever they are located, in Bucharest, Iași, Timișoara, Cernăuți, Timoc, Italy, or Spain". The website names four pillars for the party: family, nation, Christian faith, and liberty. The party characterizes its members as "the defenders of the Church". It is opposed to "gender ideology" and believes that a nation has no chance of surviving "unless it cultivates the original pattern of the classic family".

The party's representatives became popular on social media as a result of their positioning against measures taken by the government during the COVID-19 pandemic. Leading members, such as Șoșoacă (later expelled), gained thousands of followers. AUR has been described as supporting "anti-medicine, anti-vaccination" rhetoric. This accusation was rejected by George Simion, president of AUR, claiming that the party supports the "freedom of choice", also saying that the party, unlike its Western social-conservative counterparts, is not anti-abortion. The party's manifesto opposes secularism and condemns atheism, and claims that Christians are persecuted in Romania. The party has been critical of the impact of the local autonomy of Hungarians in Romania on the rights of ethnic Romanians in the centre of the country (where the Hungarians are the majority), leading to accusations of being Magyarophobic. The latter accusation was rejected by the president of AUR, and the party denounced the media, accusing media outlets of spreading false information about its campaign. Simion has cited Law and Justice and Fidesz, the ruling parties in Poland and Hungary respectively, as some of his models.

AUR wishes to position Romania as a leader in central and eastern Europe within the European Union and to integrate the Republic of Moldova into Romania. The party is pro-NATO and views the integration of Moldova into Romania as strengthening NATO's eastern flank.

AUR wishes to ensure Romania's self-sufficiency in energy, the prosecution of those deemed responsible for mismanaged post-Communist privatisation projects, and a fight against illegal logging by banning the export of non-processed wood. Additionally, AUR wishes to reform and modernize the education system, with a focus on reducing the overhead of political administration in order to improve the quality and the availability of education in Romania.

The party has a senate, which is equivalent to the National Executive Committee of other Romanian parties such as the PSD, the National Liberal Party (PNL), and the Save Romania Union (USR).

Leadership

Electoral history

Romania

Legislative elections

Notes:

1 1 senator and 4 deputies from NR were elected on AUR's list

Local elections

National results

Mayor of Bucharest

Moldova

Legislative elections

See also
 Politics of Romania
 Politics of Moldova
 Romanian Nationhood Party
 Law and Justice (Poland)

References

Further reading

External links
  
 
  (in Romanian; now defunct)

Alliance for the Union of Romanians
2019 establishments in Romania
Political parties established in 2019
2021 establishments in Moldova
Political parties established in 2021
Conservative parties in Romania
Conservative parties in Moldova
Eastern Orthodox political parties
Nationalist parties in Romania
Anti-Islam sentiment in Europe
Romanian nationalist parties
Political parties with anti-Hungarian sentiment
Antisemitism in Romania
Right-wing parties in Romania
Anti-Islam political parties in Europe
Anti-immigration politics in Europe
Far-right political parties in Romania
Anti-communist parties
National conservative parties
Social conservative parties